Telarah railway station is located on the North Coast line in New South Wales, Australia. It serves the western Maitland suburb of Telarah. It is served by NSW TrainLink Hunter line services.

The station opened on 14 August 1911 as West Maitland Marshalling Yard before being renamed Telarah on 15 April 1922.

On 18 January 2018 a freight train derailed at the station on track 2, no one was injured

Platforms & services
Telarah consists of a single platform. It is serviced by NSW TrainLink Hunter line services from Newcastle. Most services terminate at Telarah with a limited number continuing to Dungog.

Just north of the station, the North Coast line becomes single track. Both lines from Maitland are signalled for bidirectional working with trains able to arrive or leave via either line. A disused freight yard is located south of the station. It is alo north of the station where the North Coast Line and the Main North Line separate.

References

External links

Telarah station details Transport for New South Wales

Easy Access railway stations in New South Wales
Railway stations in the Hunter Region
Railway stations in Australia opened in 1911
Regional railway stations in New South Wales
North Coast railway line, New South Wales